Makari (from the Greek word Μακάρι, which expresses wishfulness) is an American ambient rock band from Orlando, Florida, formed in 2011. The band currently consists of vocalist Andy Cizek, guitarists Matt Beljan and Eric Stewart, bass guitarist John Tomasso, and drummer Kevin Beljan.

History
Makari was formed in 2011 by guitarists Matt Beljan and Eric Stewart, bass guitarist John Tomasso, drummer Kevin Beljan, vocalist Brandon Cullen and keyboardist Lindsey England.

With this lineup, Makari independently released EPs The Escape (2011), See Dreams (2013) and Ghost Stories (2015), as well as maxi-single Makari (Knives, Knives, Knives) (2012). The latter featured guest vocals from Tilian Pearson (Dance Gavin Dance, ex-Tides of Man) on a track "Life, Barefoot". During this period Makari shared the stage and toured with such acts as Hail the Sun, Capture the Crown, Jonny Craig, Palisades and Eidola among others.

In 2016, England and Cullen left the band, Spencer Pearson (ex-Decoder, ex-VersaEmerge) became the new vocalist, the band signed with InVogue Records and released Elegies EP. To promote Elegies, Makari played co-headline tours with Concepts and WVNDER in 2017.

In 2017, YouTuber Andy Cizek (WVNDER) replaced Pearson on vocals. In 2018, Makari toured extensively, playing co-headline tours with Adventurer and Wolf & Bear, and supporting Kurt Travis on his summer and fall tours. On August 3, 2018, Makari played at Vans Warped Tour '18. On August 3, 2018, Makari released their debut full-length album Hyperreal produced by Andrew Wade, to positive reviews. Promoting the album, Makari played co-headline spring tours with Softspoken and Calling All Captains, supported Kurt Travis in his "There's a Place I Want to Take You" tour, and played fall shows with Slaves and Picturesque in 2019.

In 2020, Makari released an acoustic Alternate EP featuring the songs from Hyperreal and Elegies via InVogue Records. After this release Makari decided to break ties with InVogue records and went independent. Later in 2020, Makari released Continuum EP.

On May 13, 2022, Makari released an acoustic single titled Phantom.

Band members

Current members
 Andy Cizek - vocals (2017-present)
 Matt Beljan - guitars (2011-present)
 Eric Stewart - guitars (2011-present)
 John Tomasso - bass (2011-present)
 Kevin Beljan - drums (2011-present)

Past members
 Brandon Cullen - vocals (2011-2016)
 Lindsay England - keyboards (2011-2016)
 Spencer Pearson - vocals (2016-2017)

Discography

Albums
 Hyperreal (2018)

EP
 The Escape (2011)
 See Dreams  (2013)
 Paper Ghosts (2015)
 Elegies (2016)
 Alternate (2020)
 Continuum (2020)

Singles
 Makari (Knives, Knives, Knives) (2012)
 Paper Ghosts (2014)
 Melt (2016)
 Blossom (2016)
 Control (2017)
 Better (2019)
 Transient (acoustic) (2020)
 Melt (acoustic) (2020)
 Control (Kinnecom remix) (2020)
 Labyrinth (2020)
 Let Go (2020)
 Reflection (2020)
 Phantom (2022)

Videography
 The Keeper
 Olas 
 Paper Ghosts 
 Subtitles 
 Melt 
 Starboy (The Weeknd cover)
 Control 
 Transient 
 Hyperreal 
 Better 
 Labyrinth

References

Musical groups from Orlando, Florida
American post-hardcore musical groups
Musical groups established in 2011
Musical quintets
2011 establishments in Florida